Raulandsgrend or simply Rauland is a village in Vinje Municipality in Vestfold og Telemark county, Norway. The village was once the administrative centre of the old Rauland Municipality which existed from 1860 until 1964.

Attractions
Raulandsgrend is a village that is its mountainous surroundings where tourists can partake in hiking, recreation, and skiing. Well-known snowboarding celebrity, Terje Håkonsen, started his career in Rauland. The University of South-Eastern Norway has a campus in Rauland. Rauland Church (built in 1803) is also located in the village. The Rauland Art Museum (Rauland kunstmuseum) includes sculptures, paintings, graphics, and drawings by the sculptor Dyre Vaa.

Name
The village of "Raulandsgrend" (originally the municipality) is named after the old Rauland farm since the first Rauland Church was built there. The suffix -grend is a more recent addition, simply meaning "village" or "hamlet", thus it is the village of Rauland. The many marshlands in the area are filled with bog iron and for centuries its production was an important local resource.

References

External links 
Rauland's website
Rauland kunstmuseum website

Vinje
Villages in Vestfold og Telemark